Electoral district no. 8 is one of the 12 multi-member electoral districts of the Riigikogu, the national legislature of Estonia. The district was established as electoral district no. 7 in 1995 following the re-organisation of electoral districts. It was renamed electoral district no. 8 in 2003 following another re-organisation of electoral districts. It is conterminous with the counties of Järva and Viljandi. The district currently elects seven of the 101 members of the Riigikogu using the open party-list proportional representation electoral system. At the 2019 parliamentary election it had 61,657 registered electors.

Electoral system
Electoral district no. 8 currently elects seven of the 101 members of the Riigikogu using the open party-list proportional representation electoral system. The allocation of seats is carried out in three stages. In the first stage, any individual candidate, regardless of whether they are a party or independent candidate, who receives more votes than the district's simple quota (Hare quota: valid votes in district/number of seats allocated to district) is elected via a personal mandate. In the second stage, district mandates are allocated to parties by dividing their district votes by the district's simple quota. Only parties that reach the 5% national threshold compete for district mandates and any personal mandates won by the party are subtracted from the party's district mandates. Prior to 2003 if a party's surplus/remainder votes was equal to or greater than 75% of the district's simple quota it received one additional district mandate. Any unallocated district seats are added to a national pool of compensatory seats. In the final stage, compensatory mandates are calculated based on the national vote and using a modified D'Hondt method. Only parties that reach the 5% national threshold compete for compensatory seats and any personal and district mandates won by the party are subtracted from the party's compensatory mandates. Though calculated nationally, compensatory mandates are allocated at the district level.

Seats
Seats allocated to electoral district no. 8 by the National Electoral Committee of Estonia at each election was as follows:
 2023 - 7
 2019 - 7
 2015 - 7
 2011 - 8
 2007 - 8
 2003 - 9
 1999 - 9
 1995 - 10

Election results

Summary

(Excludes compensatory seats)

Detailed

2023
Results of the 2023 parliamentary election held on 5 March 2023:

The following candidates were elected:
 Personal mandates - Jürgen Ligi (REF), 5,797 votes.
 District mandates -  Helmen Kütt (SDE), 2,098 votes; Jaak Madison (EKRE), 5,222 votes; Pipi-Liis Siemann (REF), 2,498 votes; and Helir-Valdor Seeder (IE), 2,689 votes.
 Compensatory mandates - Lauri Läänemets (SDE), 1,731 votes; and Jaak Aab (KESK), 1,562 votes.

2019
Results of the 2019 parliamentary election held on 3 March 2019:

The following candidates were elected:
 Personal mandates - Jürgen Ligi (RE), 6,069 votes; and Jaak Madison (EKRE), 5,612 votes.
 District mandates - Jaak Aab (K), 2,227 votes; Yoko Alender (RE), 997 votes; Helmen Kütt (SDE), 2,194 votes; and Helir-Valdor Seeder (I), 3,138 votes.
 Compensatory mandates - Kersti Sarapuu (K), 1,394 votes.

2015
Results of the 2015 parliamentary election held on 1 March 2015:

The following candidates were elected:
 Personal mandates - Jürgen Ligi (RE), 6,757 votes.
 District mandates - Johannes Kert (RE), 752 votes; Helmen Kütt (SDE), 3,817 votes; Mailis Reps (K), 2,981 votes; and Helir-Valdor Seeder (IRL), 2,908 votes.
 Compensatory mandates - Jaak Madison (EKRE), 1,883 votes; Jaanus Marrandi (SDE), 1,050 votes; Kersti Sarapuu (K), 1,164 votes; and Priit Toobal (K), 1,045 votes.

2011
Results of the 2011 parliamentary election held on 6 March 2011:

The following candidates were elected:
 Personal mandates - Sven Mikser (SDE), 7,431 votes.
 District mandates - Enn Eesmaa (K), 1,535 votes; Kaia Iva (IRL), 1,064 votes; Kalle Jents (RE), 1,346 votes; Helmen Kütt (SDE), 1,693 votes; Jürgen Ligi (RE), 5,043 votes; and Helir-Valdor Seeder (IRL), 4,479 votes.
 Compensatory mandates - Peep Aru (RE), 896 votes; Tõnis Kõiv (RE), 961 votes; and Priit Toobal (K), 796 votes.

2007
Results of the 2007 parliamentary election held on 4 March 2007:

The following candidates were elected:
 District mandates - Jaak Aab (K), 4,229 votes; Meelis Atonen (RE), 4,687 votes; Tõnis Kõiv (RE), 1,926 votes; Jaanus Marrandi (ERL), 1,108 votes; Sven Mikser (SDE), 4,280 votes; and Helir-Valdor Seeder (IRL), 4,089 votes.
 Compensatory mandates - Peep Aru (RE), 1,568 votes; Kaia Iva (IRL), 886 votes; Jaan Kundla (K), 496 votes; and Arvo Sarapuu (K), 913 votes.

2003
Results of the 2003 parliamentary election held on 2 March 2003:

The following candidates were elected:
 District mandates - Jaak Allik (ERL), 1,937 votes; Peep Aru (RE), 2,064 votes; Andres Jalak (ÜVE-RP), 1,698 votes; Arnold Kimber (K), 1,830 votes; Jaanus Marrandi (K), 3,502 votes; Jaanus Rahumägi (ÜVE-RP), 3,798 votes; and Helir-Valdor Seeder (I), 2,524 votes.
 Compensatory mandates - Toomas Hendrik Ilves (RM), 1,430 votes.

1999
Results of the 1999 parliamentary election held on 7 March 1999:

The following candidates were elected:
 Personal mandates - Mart Laar (I), 5,446 votes.
 District mandates - Toomas Hendrik Ilves (M), 4,521 votes; Ants Käärma (KE), 2,179 votes; Peeter Kreitzberg (K), 2,252 votes; and Jaanus Marrandi (K), 2,373 votes.
 Compensatory mandates - Sven Mikser (K), 721 votes; Märt Rask (RE), 1,647 votes; and Andres Taimla (RE), 531 votes.

1995
Results of the 1995 parliamentary election held on 5 March 1995:

The following candidates were elected:
 Personal mandates - Ants Käärma (KMÜ), 5,818 votes.
 District mandates - Jaak Allik (KMÜ), 4,476 votes; Valve Kirsipuu (RE), 4,035 votes; Tiit Made (K), 3,674 votes; Ilmar Mändmets (KMÜ), 2,506 votes; and Raoul Üksvärav (KMÜ), 4,582 votes.
 Compensatory mandates - Vootele Hansen (P), 789 votes; Mart Laar (I\ERSP), 2,093 votes; and Andres Taimla (RE), 473 votes.

References

Riigikogu electoral district
08
08
Riigikogu electoral district